Mike Lookingland (born 13 September 1983) is an American soccer defender who played for the Milwaukee Wave of the Major Arena Soccer League in the 2014–2015 season.  He was the 2012 Major Indoor Soccer League Defender of the Year.

Player
Lookingland graduated from Loyola Blakefield.  He attended Bucknell University, playing on the men's soccer team from 2001 to 2004.  He was a 2004 Third Team All American.  In 2003 and 2004, he played for the Chesapeake Dragons of the Premier Development League during the collegiate off season.  On 4 February 2005, Real Salt Lake selected Lookingland in the second round (thirteenth overall) of the 2005 MLS Supplemental Draft.  He spent two seasons in Salt Lake.  In 2007, he moved to the Harrisburg City Islanders of the USL Second Division.  In 2008, he played for Crystal Palace Baltimore.  In addition to his outdoor career, Lookingland has an extensive indoor career.  In 2005, he signed with the Baltimore Blast.  He was named to the 2005–2006 All Rookie team and was the 2012 Major Indoor Soccer League Defender of the Year.

Coach
On 4 April 2012, the Baltimore Bohemians hired Lookingland as an assistant coach.

On December 13, 2021, Lookingland was named head coach for Christos FC's USL League Two team ahead of their first season in the league.

Career statistics
(correct as of 27 September 2008)

Personal
Lookingland is of Scottish descent and is a keen Motherwell F.C. supporter. He is also a 7 time USA East Regional Champion from Maryland. He holds the Maryland state record for most regional championships.

References

External links
 

1983 births
Living people
American people of Scottish descent
American soccer coaches
American soccer players
Association football defenders
Association football midfielders
Association football utility players
Baltimore Blast (2001–2008 MISL) players
Baltimore Blast (2008–2014 MISL) players
Bucknell University alumni
Crystal Palace Baltimore players
Penn FC players
Major Indoor Soccer League (2001–2008) players
Major League Soccer players
People from Fallston, Maryland
Real Salt Lake players
Soccer players from Maryland
USL Second Division players
Chesapeake Dragons players
USL League Two players
Major Indoor Soccer League (2008–2014) players
Real Salt Lake draft picks
USL League Two coaches